Ross Cadell (born 4 April 1969) is an Australian politician. He is a member of the National Party and was elected to the Senate on the Coalition's ticket in New South Wales at the 2022 federal election, to a term beginning on 1 July 2022. He was previously the state director of the party in New South Wales.

Early life
Cadell was born on 4 April 1969 in Waratah, New South Wales. He grew up in Newcastle.

Career
Cadell was the event manager for the Newcastle National Maritime Festival from 2002 to 2004. He subsequently worked in motorsport sponsorship, including as manager for former F1 driver Alex Yoong, before joining National Rugby League (NRL) team Newcastle Knights as sponsorship manager in June 2005. He later became commercial director of Prodigy Motorsport, a Newcastle-based motorsport team that sought to enter the V8 Supercars.

In 2020, Cadell was hired by the Port of Newcastle as special projects director. He was tasked with lobbying the New South Wales state government for the development of a deepwater freight container terminal in Newcastle.

Politics
Cadell was elected state president of the Young Liberals in 1998. He later joined the National Party, working for the party as an organiser and campaign manager from 2010. He was involved in several state and federal election campaigns, as well as managing Barnaby Joyce's campaign at the 2017 New England by-election. He was appointed state director of the party in 2018, serving until 2020.

In June 2021, Cadell won preselection as the National Party's lead Senate candidate in New South Wales at the next federal election. He was placed second on the joint Coalition ticket with the Liberal Party, defeating former party leader and deputy prime minister John Anderson in the preselection ballot. He was elected to a six-year Senate term beginning on 1 July 2022.

References

National Party of Australia politicians
Living people
University of Newcastle (Australia) alumni
1969 births